Woodlands Church (formerly known as Fellowship of The Woodlands or FOTW) is a Baptist megachurch located in The Woodlands, Texas, about 27 miles north of downtown Houston, Texas, led by Senior Pastor Kerry Shook. It is affiliated with the Southern Baptist Convention.

The church is located on two campuses. The main campus is in The Woodlands, Texas with the other in Atascocita, Texas.

History
Kerry Shook established the church in 1993 with his wife, Chris Shook. It initially had eight worshipers, and rented facilities at The Woodlands High School for its services. Shook was previously a pastor at Airline Manor Baptist Church.

In 2001 it had about 10,000 members in its congregation, with that number attending on a basis of two to three months, and with 6,000 regularly going every weekend. Its permanent church building opened on August 19, 2001. It is located on a  plot of land, with a  building, including a 4,000 seat multipurpose room. The facility had a cost of $24 million.

In 2005 it held a 12th-anniversary celebration with Randy Travis performing.

Circa 2007 the church had about 14,000 worshipers per Sunday. About 2,000 of them, including 800 regular worshipers, were from Atascocita/Humble/Kingwood area of Houston. In response to the numbers of Worshipers, the church established Woodlands Church East, a satellite center, held at Atascocita High School on Sundays.

By 2008 the number of total Sunday worshipers in The Woodlands and Atascocita had increased to 15,000, and its congregation included about 3,000 children. The church had established a children's center at its main Woodlands church. On September 14 of that year it established another satellite campus held at the Concordia Lutheran High School in Tomball (since closed).

In 2013 the church had about 2,000 parishioners from Conroe or from areas north of Conroe; that year it began the Conroe campus (since closed) with worship at Conroe High School.  An additional campus was started in Katy, Texas, but it has also closed.

Beliefs 
The church has a Baptist confession of faith and is a member of the Southern Baptist Convention.

See also
 Christianity in Houston

References

External links 
 Woodlands Church Official Site
 Woodlands Church Online
 Kerry Shook Ministries Official Site

The Woodlands, Texas
Churches in Texas
Evangelical megachurches in the United States
Megachurches in Texas
Christian organizations established in 1993
Southern Baptist Convention churches
Baptist churches in Texas